Zahmakan (also Romanized as Zahmakān, Zaḩmekān, and Zehmakān) is a village in Hur Rural District, in the Central District of Faryab County, Kerman Province, Iran. At the 2006 census, its population was 847, in 209 families.

References 

Populated places in Faryab County